David Gateri (born 9 June 1994) is a Kenyan international footballer who plays for Nairobi City Stars as a midfielder.

Career
Born in Nairobi, Gateri has played club football for Nairobi City Stars, ASD Cape Town, Bandari, Nakumatt, Ushuru, Tusker and Mount Kenya United.

In September 2010, following elite scouting, Gateri went to Cape United Soccer School of excellence in Cape Town-South Africa and passed trials.  He delayed his move due to school exams but joined them later in June 2011.

Part of the highlight of his football was back in April 2013 when, while part of ASD Academy, he went for a two-week trial at English Premier League side Sunderland. 

After four years at ASD Academy he returned home to join coastal side Bandari, before spending time with Nakumatt, Ushuru, Tusker and Mount Kenya United.

He was handed his international debut for Kenya in 2011.

References

1994 births
Living people
Kenyan footballers
Kenya international footballers
Nairobi City Stars players
Association football midfielders
Kenyan expatriate footballers
Kenyan expatriates in South Africa
Expatriate soccer players in South Africa
Bandari F.C. (Kenya) players
Mt Kenya United F.C. players
Ushuru F.C. players
Tusker F.C. players
Kenyan Premier League players